Arthur Rodgers (8 February 1907 – 1987) was an English footballer who played as a left back in the Football League for Hull City and Doncaster Rovers.

Playing career
Rodgers started off with local club Frickley Colliery and then Denaby United.

Hull City
He signed for Hull City in 1928, making 67 League appearances before being released at the end of the 1931–32 season.

Doncaster Rovers
Doncaster signed him from Welsh club, Merthyr Town of the Southern League for the 1933–34 season. He made his first appearance the following season in a 2–0 home win against Southport on 4 September 1934. His only goal for the club was the significant winner in a 2–1 victory at Wrexham on 27 April 1935, which clinched the Division 3 (North) title, winning promotion for Doncaster to Division 2.

Rodgers was a regular feature in the side, with a few periods of competition with other full-backs. He played every league and FA Cup game in 1937–38. At the start of the following season, Albert Walker, a left−back, arrived from West Ham as part of an exchange for Arthur Banner, and replaced Rodgers a few games into the season. He then went on to make a few appearances as right-back, his last game being against Halifax Town on 18 October. Rodgers retired at the end of the season after a total of 183 league and cup games, and that one goal.

Honours
Doncaster Rovers
Third Division North
Champions 1934–35

References

1907 births
1987 deaths
Footballers from Doncaster
English footballers
Association football defenders
Frickley Athletic F.C. players
Denaby United F.C. players
Hull City A.F.C. players
Merthyr Town F.C. players
Doncaster Rovers F.C. players
English Football League players